John Wright Hazelton (December 10, 1814, Mullica Hill, New Jersey – December 20, 1878, Mullica Hill), was an American Republican Party politician, who served in the United States House of Representatives, where he represented New Jersey's 1st congressional district from 1871 to 1875.

Early life and education
Hazelton was born in Mullica Hill, New Jersey (within Harrison Township) on December 10, 1814. He attended the common schools and engaged in agricultural pursuits.

Political career
He was a delegate to the Republican National Convention in 1856 and 1868.

Hazelton was elected as a Republican to the Forty-second and Forty-third Congresses, serving in office from March 4, 1871 – March 3, 1875, but was an unsuccessful candidate for reelection in 1874 to the Forty-fourth Congress.

Later career and death
After leaving Congress, he resumed agricultural pursuits.

He died near Mullica Hill on December 20, 1878 and was interred in Friends Cemetery in Mullica Hill.

External links

Biography for John Wright Hazelton from The Political Graveyard

1814 births
1878 deaths
People from Harrison Township, New Jersey
Republican Party members of the United States House of Representatives from New Jersey
19th-century American politicians